The High Command Trial (officially, The United States of America vs. Wilhelm von Leeb, et al.), also known initially as Case No. 12 (the 13 Generals' Trial), and later as Case No. 72 (the German high command trial: Trial of Wilhelm von Leeb and thirteen others), was the last of the twelve trials for war crimes the U.S. authorities held in their occupation zone of Germany in Nuremberg after the end of World War II. These twelve trials were all held before U.S. military courts, not before the International Military Tribunal, but took place in the same rooms at the Palace of Justice. The twelve U.S. trials are collectively known as the "subsequent Nuremberg trials" or, more formally, as the "Trials of War Criminals before the Nuremberg Military Tribunals" (NMT).

Background

The accused in this trial were high-ranking generals of the German Wehrmacht (including two field marshals of the Army, one field marshal of the air force and one general admiral), some of whom had been members of the High Command of Nazi Germany's military forces. They were charged with having participated in or planned or facilitated the execution of the numerous war crimes and atrocities committed in countries occupied by the German forces during the war.

The judges in this case, heard before Military Tribunal V-A, were the American John C. Young (presiding judge), Winfield B. Hale, and Justin W. Harding. The Chief of Counsel for the Prosecution was Telford Taylor. The indictment was filed on November 28, 1947; the trial lasted from December 30 that year until October 28, 1948.

Indictment 
The accused faced four charges of having committed war crimes and crimes against humanity:
 Crimes against peace by waging aggressive war against other nations and violating international treaties.
 War crimes by being responsible for murder, ill-treatment and other crimes against prisoners of war and enemy belligerents.
 Crimes against humanity by participating or ordering the murder, torture, deportation, hostage-taking, etc. of civilians in military-occupied countries.
 Participating and organizing the formulations and execution of a common plan and conspiracy to commit aforementioned crimes.

All defendants were indicted on all counts; they all pleaded "not guilty". Count 4 of the indictment—the conspiracy charge—was soon dropped by the tribunal because it was already covered by the other charges. On count 1, the tribunal considered all accused not guilty, stating that they were not the policy-makers and that preparing for war and fighting a war on orders was not a criminal offense under the applicable international law of the time.

Defendants and judgements
Of the 14 defendants indicted, Otto Schniewind and Hugo Sperrle were acquitted on all counts. Johannes Blaskowitz committed suicide during the trial and the 11 remaining defendants received prison sentences ranging from three years to lifetime imprisonment. All sentences included time already served in custody since 7 April 1945. The table below shows, with respect to each charge, whether the accused were either indicted but not convicted (I) or indicted and found guilty (G) and is listed by defendant, charge and outcome.

Aftermath
The German public opinion was against the trial. Many denied the facts found by the U.S. judges, extolled the defense of obedience to superior orders, and praised the soldierly qualities of the defendants. Particularly active were the Protestant and Catholic churches.

After the emergence of the Federal Republic, German Chancellor Konrad Adenauer and the Bundestag weighed in on the side of the defendants. German leverage increased as the urgency of rearming Germany grew. Under these intense pressures, in 1950, U.S. High Commissioner John McCloy established a review panel chaired by Judge David Peck of New York and, on its recommendation, reduced the sentences of three of the six High Command defendants still in prison. After further proceedings by mixed commissions composed of Allied and German members, the last of the High Command defendants returned home in 1954.

See also 
Command responsibility
Subsequent Nuremberg Trials

Notes

References 
Law Reports of Trials of War Criminals, Vol. XII, 1949 of the United Nations War Crimes Commission.

 
 

United States Nuremberg Military Tribunals